Clogh, also spelt as Clough, is a small village in County Antrim, Northern Ireland, 9 miles from Ballymena. It is situated within the Glenravel ward of the Braid electoral area of Mid and East Antrim District Council. It had a population of 220 people (90 households) in the 2011 Census. (2001 Census: 105 people)

Dunaghy Old Rectory, on the main street, is one of the village's most striking buildings. There are three churches in the vicinity. St. James Dunaghy Parish Church of Ireland is situated at the fork junction at the bottom of the main street. The Gospel Hall is located on main street. While the large Presbyterian Church is situated just outside the village.

The village's community centre is housed in a building that was originally Clough Baptist Church at the top of the Main Street. The Church closed in the early 1990s, the building was not reopened as the community centre until 2005. It has since host numerous functions and is widely used by the whole community.

See also 
List of towns and villages in Northern Ireland
List of places in County Antrim

References 

Culture Northern Ireland

External links 
Clogh - Lewis, 1837

Villages in County Antrim